Molson Indy Vancouver was an annual Champ Car race held in a street circuit near BC Place and running past Science World in Vancouver, British Columbia, Canada held in July, August or September from 1990 to 2004. 

On September 2, 1990, the first race took place on the original circuit, which was won by Al Unser Jr. From 1998, a new circuit was created to the east of the old Pacific Place, where only a small part of the original circuit was used. The circuit was popular with drivers and often produced an entertaining race. For most of its fifteen years, the Vancouver Indy attracted in excess of 100,000 spectators over the course of its weekends, and in 1996 held the Canadian single-day sporting event attendance record until it was beaten by the Formula 1 Canadian Grand Prix in Montreal that year.  The final event in 2004 had race day attendance of 63,000 with a total three day turnout of 158,420 spectators.  However, from 2004, Vancouver was left off the Champ Car fixture list. 

In July 2021 it was announced a new race for the electric-powered FIA Formula E World Championship, the Vancouver ePrix would be run on the same site. However on 18 June 2022, it was announced that the race contract was terminated.

Lap Records
The official race lap records at Molson Indy Vancouver are listed as:

Controversy and cancellation
For much of its time in Vancouver, the Molson Indy was a source of considerable local controversy, as local residents complained of the noise and disruption caused by this major event. As the lands of the former Expo 86 site were developed into the billion-dollar condominium development by Concord Pacific, debates raged over whether the Indy made Vancouver a "world-class city" or an "urban nightmare." Such debates were chronicled by Mark Douglas Lowes in his 2002 book, Indy Dreams and Urban Nightmares: Speed Merchants, Spectacle, and the Struggle over Public Space in the World-Class City. 

The official explanation for the cancellation came from Jo-Ann McArthur, president of sponsoring Molson Sports and Entertainment, who stated that "the bottom line is the business model couldn't work". The race had just two seasons left in the city, due to the impending construction of the Olympic Village for the 2010 Winter Olympics on the south end of the course. She stated that the lack of a long-term commitment to holding the event made it difficult to attract sponsors to continue the race.

Following the cancellation, Champ Car continued to race in the Canadian cities of Toronto, Montreal and Edmonton as part of the 2005 season.

Layout history

CART/Champ Car race winners

Indy Lights/Atlantic winners

External links
 Champ Car Stats
 Ultimate Racing History

References

Vancouver
 
Vancouver
Vancouver
Vancouver